Andy Murray was the defending champion, but chose not to participate.
David Ferrer won the title, defeating Steve Johnson in the final, 4–6, 6–4, 7–5.

Seeds

Draw

Finals

Top half

Bottom half

Qualifying

Seeds

Qualifiers

Qualifying draw

First qualifier

Second qualifier

Third qualifier

Fourth qualifier

References
 Main Draw
 Qualifying Draw

Erste Bank Open - Singles
2015 Singles
Erste Bank Open Singles